Carex metallica, the white-spike sedge, is a species of flowering plant in the family Cyperaceae, native to southeastern China, Taiwan, Korea, and Japan. Its densely tufted culms can reach .

References

metallica
Flora of Southeast China
Flora of Eastern Asia
Plants described in 1908